The Carlstrom Foothills are a group of peaks and ridges running north–south between Mount Albert Markham and Kelly Plateau in the Churchill Mountains. It was named by the Advisory Committee on Antarctic Names after John Carlstrom of the Department of Astronomy and Astrophysics, University of Chicago; Projects Director, Center for Astrophysical Research in Antarctica at South Pole Station from 2001.

Features
Geographical features include:

 Bally Glacier
 Benbrook Glacier
 Egress Peak
 Mount Blick
 Pernic Bluff

References 

Mountains of the Ross Dependency
Transantarctic Mountains
Shackleton Coast